Huidobro is a surname. Notable people with the surname include:

Eleuterio Fernández Huidobro (1942-2016), Uruguayan guerrilla fighter and politician
Gerardo Huidobro, Peruvian swimmer
Norma Huidobro
Pascual Ruiz Huidobro (1752-1813) Spanish colonial governor, active in Montevideo
Vicente Huidobro (1893–1948), Chilean poet
Zuleyma Huidobro (born 1978), Mexican politician
Other uses
Huidobro, populated place in Burgos Province, Spain
Villa Huidobro, populated place in Córdoba Province, Argentina